Man Wei Chong (Pha̍k-fa-sṳ: Man Vúi-tshûng / Van Vui-tshûng; born 5 September 1999) is a Malaysian badminton player who specializes in doubles event. He was one of the compatriots of the Malaysian squad that won the silver medals in 2016 and 2017 BWF World Junior Championships.

Career 
As a doubles back up player for the Malaysia national team, Man Wei Chong has won three men's doubles titles in 2021 partnering Tee Kai Wun in Poland, Spain , and Ireland. 

In 2022, Man claimed his first World Tour title by winning the Super 300 event at the 2022 Syed Modi International in the men's doubles partnering Tee Kai Wun. In May, he competed at the 2021 Southeast Asian Games in Vietnam, and helps the team won the silver medal in the men's team event. In July, Man and Tee captured their second World Tour title at the 2022 Taipei Open beating reigning Olympic champion Lee Yang and Wang Chi-lin in three games.

Achievements

BWF World Tour (2 titles)
The BWF World Tour, which was announced on 19 March 2017 and implemented in 2018, is a series of elite badminton tournaments sanctioned by the Badminton World Federation (BWF). The BWF World Tour is divided into levels of World Tour Finals, Super 1000, Super 750, Super 500, Super 300 (part of the HSBC World Tour), and the BWF Tour Super 100.

Men's doubles

BWF International Challenge/Series (3 titles, 3 runners-up) 
Men's doubles

Mixed doubles

  BWF International Challenge tournament
  BWF International Series tournament

References 

1999 births
Living people
People from Malacca
Malaysian sportspeople of Chinese descent
Malaysian male badminton players
Competitors at the 2021 Southeast Asian Games
Southeast Asian Games silver medalists for Malaysia
Southeast Asian Games medalists in badminton